Marcel Sisniega Campbell (July 28, 1959 – January 19, 2013) was a Mexican chess Grandmaster and film director. Sisniega was born in Chicago but grew up in Cuernavaca, Mexico. Sisniega earned the International Master title in 1978 and the Grandmaster title in 1992. Sisniega was a nine-time Mexican champion and three-time Carlos Torre Repetto Memorial winner. During his chess career he beat Viswanathan Anand, Artur Yusupov, Miguel Illescas and Jesús Nogueiras amongst others. He largely stopped playing after the early 1990s.

He was also a film writer and director. He is most recognized for his work in creating "Libre de Culpas" in 1997. His brother is modern pentathlete and politician Ivar Sisniega, and his children are Mexican-American actress Sofía Sisniega, Vera, David and Julian Sisniega.

Sisniega died suddenly of a heart attack on January 19, 2013.

See also
List of people from Morelos, Mexico

References

External links
 Marcel Sisniega Campbell player profile at Chess DB
 
 Masterpieces of Attack: The Brilliant Games of GM Marcel Sisniega Campbell book review at chesscafe.com
 Official site of the annual Marcel Sisniega Memorial Tournament

1959 births
2013 deaths
Sportspeople from Morelos
Mexican people of Scottish descent
People from Cuernavaca
Chess grandmasters
Mexican chess players
Mexican film directors
Mexican people of Irish descent